Raja Jhia Sange Heigala Bhaba is an Oriya drama and romance film released on 10 June 2012.  Starring Arindam Roy, Archita Sahu and Mihir Das in key roles.
veteran actress Mahasweta Roy being  enacted the role of mother of Arindam Roy and Mihir Das played the role of father of Archita Sahu. The film is about strategic love dilemma of a rich girl with a poor boy. Arindam Roy was selected to play the lead role.

Synopsis
Balia who has lost his father since early live with his mother Janaki in a slum. He has massive  physical strength, but his mother always  worried for Balia because of his innocence but confident on his physical strength. Janaki always wanted his son should be educated. To keep his mother satisfy, Balia join a college forcefully by threatening the college principal. There he encountered with Kandhei, daughter of an influential and powerful Pratap Choudhury. Subsequently Kandhei falls in Love with Balia because of his honesty and innocence. Their passion  of love goes deep. Kandhei transformed Balia form a street rowdy to a sociable gentle man. But when Pratap and his family know the love affair of Balia and Kandhei, they threaten Balia and put him in to jail by their influences. In the meanwhile the family of Kandhei arrange marriage of her. By knowing this. Balia escapes from jail and later finds Kandhei suicides. Balia lives his rest of life with the memory of Kandhei.

Cast
 Arindam Roy as Balaram Sahu (Balia)
 Archita Sahu as Kalyani (Kandhei)
 Mahashweta Roy as Janaki Sahu (Balaram's mother)
 Mihir Das as Pratap Choudhury (Kandhei's father)
 Pradyumna Lenka as Principal Bhaja Behera
 Harihara Mahapatra as Dhurandhar Behera
 Kirti Mohanty as Kalyani's mother
 Satyaki Misra as Kalyani's brother
 Subashish as Mahendra
 Ananta Misra as Professor

Review
The film received mixed response from critics. Incredible Orissa penned "Raja Jhia Sange Heigala Bhaba is a good film. Nicely picturised, colorful movie. But storyline is nothing new for the audience."

Soundtrack
The Soundtrack album was premiered at Red FM 93.5, Bhubaneswar on 28 May 2012. The Music for the film is composed by Prem Anand.

Box office
The Film released in Raja festival along with Rangeela Toka and Love Master.

Awards
 4th Etv Oriya Film Awards 2013
 Best Actor – Arindam Roy
 Best Director – Sudhansu Sahu 
 
 4th Tarang Cine Awards 2013
 Best Supporting Role Female (Nominated)-Mahasweta Roy
 Best Actor in Negative Role Female (Nominated)- Kirty Mohanty

References

External links
 

2012 films
2010s Odia-language films
Films directed by Sudhanshu Sahu